The Honeywell 316 was a popular 16-bit minicomputer built by Honeywell starting in 1969. It is part of the Series 16, which includes the Models 116 (1965, discrete), 316 (1969), 416 (1966), 516 (1966) and DDP-716 (1969). They were commonly used for data acquisition and control, remote message concentration, clinical laboratory systems, Remote Job Entry and time-sharing. The Series-16 computers are all based on the DDP-116 designed by Gardner Hendrie at Computer Control Company, Inc. (3C) in 1964.

The 516 and later the 316 were used as Interface Message Processors (IMP) for the American ARPANET and the British NPL Network.

History
Computer Control Company developed a computer series named Digital Data Processor, of which it built two models:
 DDP-116 - the first of the Series 16
 DDP-124 - part of a trio of 24-bit systems: DDP-24, 124, 224.

Honeywell bought the company after the 24 trio, and built the balance of the Series 16.

The H-316 was used by Charles H. Moore to develop the first complete, stand-alone implementation of Forth at NRAO. The Honeywell 516 was used in the NPL network, and the 516 and later the 316 were used as Interface Message Processors (IMP) for the ARPANET. It could also be configured as a Terminal IMP (TIP), which added support for up to 63 teletype machines through a multi-line controller.

The original Prime computers were designed to be compatible with the Series-16 minicomputers.

The Honeywell 316 also had industrial applications. A 316 was used at Bradwell nuclear power station in Essex as the primary reactor temperature-monitoring computer until summer 2000, when the internal 160k disk failed. Two PDP-11/70s, which had previously been secondary monitors, were moved to primary.

Hardware description
The 316 succeeded the earlier DDP-516 model and was promoted by Honeywell as suitable for industrial process control, data-acquisition systems, and as a communications concentrator and processor. The computer processor was made from small-scale integration DTL monolithic silicon integrated circuits. Most parts of the system operated at 2.5 MHz, and some elements were clocked at 5 MHz. The computer was a bitwise-parallel 2's complement system with 16-bit word length. The instruction set was a single-address type with an index register. Initially released with a capacity of 4096 through 16,384 words of memory, later expansion options allowed increasing memory space to 32,768 words. Memory cycle time was 1.6 microseconds; an integer register-to-register "add" instruction took 3.2 microseconds. An optional hardware arithmetic option was available to implement integer multiply and divide, double-precision load and store, and double-precision (31-bit) integer addition and subtraction operations. It also provided a normalization operation, assisting implementation of software floating-point operations.

The programmers' model of the H-316 consisted of the following registers:
 The 16-bit A register was the primary arithmetic and logic accumulator.
 The 16-bit B register was used for double-length arithmetic operations.
 The 16-bit program counter holds the address of the next instruction.
 A carry flag indicated arithmetic overflow.
 A 16-bit X index register was also provided for modification of the address of operands.

The instruction set had 72 arithmetic, logic, I/O and flow-control instructions.

Input/output instructions used the A register and separate input and output 16-bit buses. A 10-bit I/O control bus, consisting of 6 bits of device address information and 4 bits of function selection, was used. The basic processor had a single interrupt signal line, and an option provided up to 48 interrupts. 
 
In addition to a front-panel display of lights and toggle switches, the system supported different types of input/output devices. A Teletype Model 33 ASR teleprinter could be used as a console I/O device and (in the most basic systems) to load and store data to paper tape. Smaller systems typically used a high-speed paper-tape reader and punch for data storage. The Honeywell family of peripherals included card readers and punches, line printers, magnetic tape, and both fixed-head and removable hard disk drives.

Honeywell advertised the system as the first minicomputer selling for less than $10,000.

The Honeywell 316 has the distinction of being the first computer displayed at a computer show with semiconductor RAM memory. In 1972, a Honeywell 316 was displayed with a semiconductor RAM memory board (they used core memory previously). It was never placed into production, as DTL was too power-hungry to survive much longer. Honeywell knew that the same technology that enabled the production of RAM spelled the end of DTL computers, and wanted to show that the company was cutting edge.

System software
Honeywell provided up to 500 software packages that could run on the H-316 processor. A FORTRAN IV compiler was available, as well as an assembler, real-time disk operating systems and system utilities and libraries.

Kitchen Computer 

The Honeywell Kitchen Computer was a special offering of the H316 pedestal model by Neiman Marcus in 1969 as one of a continuing series of extravagant gift ideas. It was offered for US$10,000, weighed over 100 pounds (over 45 kg) and was advertised as useful for storing recipes. The imagined uses of the Honeywell Kitchen Computer also included assistance with meal planning and balancing the family checkbook – the marketing of which included highly traditional and patronizing representations of housewives. Reading or entering these recipes would have been nearly impossible for the average intended user, since the user interface required the user to complete a two-week course just to learn how to program the device, using only toggle-switch input and binary-light output. To round out the domestic marketing, the pedestal model's writing surface was rebranded as a built-in cutting board and the computer would have a few recipes built in. No evidence has been found that any Honeywell Kitchen Computers were ever sold, though Honeywell did sell a small number (less than 20) pedestal computers outside of the Neiman Marcus branding.

The full text of the Neiman-Marcus Advertisement reads: 

Although a fantasy gift, the Kitchen Computer represented the first time a computer was offered as a consumer product.

See also

SIMH
Honeywell 200
Honeywell 6000 series
Honeywell 800

References

External links
Honeywell Series 16
Honeywell Minicomputer Simulation
Honeywell H316 Kitchen Computer on www.old-computers.com
 Honeywell 316 technical data

Honeywell computers
Minicomputers
16-bit computers